Ruth R. Faden is an American scientist, academic, and founder of the Johns Hopkins Berman Institute of Bioethics. She was the Berman Institute's Director from 1995 until 2016, and the inaugural Andreas C. Dracopoulos Director from 2014 to 2016. Faden is the inaugural Philip Franklin Wagley Professor of Biomedical Ethics.

Faden is a member of the Institute of Medicine and a Fellow of The Hastings Center and the American Psychological Association. She has served on President Clinton's Advisory Committee on Human Radiation Experiments, which she chaired. Faden co-launched the Global Food Ethics and Policy Program, sponsor of the 7 by 5 Agenda for Ethics and Global Food Security. She is also a co-founder of the Hinxton Group, a global community committed to advancing ethical and policy challenges in stem cell science, and the Second Wave initiative, an effort to ensure that the health interests of pregnant women are fairly represented in biomedical research and drug and device policies.

In 2011, Faden was the recipient of Lifetime Achievement Awards from the American Society for Bioethics and Humanities (ASBH) and Public Responsibility in Medicine and Research (PRIMR).

Faden was born and raised in Philadelphia. At 16, Faden was accepted to Temple University, where she studied for two years before transferring to the University of Pennsylvania, where she earned her bachelor's degree. Faden later earned her M.A. from the University of Chicago, and her MPH and PhD from University of California, Berkeley.

Academic work
Faden is the author and editor of books and articles on biomedical ethics and public policy, including Social Justice: The Moral Foundations of Public Health and Health Policy (with Madison Powers) and A History and Theory of Informed Consent (with Tom L. Beauchamp).

Publications

Books

References

External links
Johns Hopkins Berman Institute of Bioethics
Ruth Faden's page at Johns Hopkins Berman Institute of Bioethics

1949 births
Living people
Bioethicists
Hastings Center Fellows
Members of the National Academy of Medicine